Jerry Allen Walker (born February 12, 1939) is an American former professional baseball pitcher. He played in Major League Baseball (MLB) for the Baltimore Orioles, Kansas City Athletics, and Cleveland Indians between 1957 and 1964. He signed with the Orioles as a "bonus baby" out of Ada's Byng High School on June 28, 1957, and continued his education at East Central University.

Pitching career
A member of the Orioles' fabled "Kiddie Corps" of young pitchers signed in the late 1950s (others included Milt Pappas, Steve Barber and Chuck Estrada), Walker is one of a very few players to have gone straight to the Major Leagues without ever playing a game in the minor leagues. In his debut, on July 6, 1957, against the Boston Red Sox, he failed to retire a batter, issuing bases on balls to Mickey Vernon and Jackie Jensen, then uncorking a wild pitch. Walker then was lifted from the game, but both runners scored, giving Walker an earned run average of infinity coming out of his first MLB game. However, he was consistently more effective as the season progressed, and threw a four-hit, complete game shutout against the Washington Senators on September 4, beating Camilo Pascual 1–0 for his first big-league victory.

He went three innings and allowed one run on two hits and one base on balls, and was credited with the win in a 5–3 AL victory at Los Angeles Memorial Coliseum. Later that season, on September 11, 1959, he hurled a 16-inning, complete game shutout against the eventual league champion Chicago White Sox, winning 1–0. It was his 11th and final win of the 1959 season, his most successful campaign in the big leagues.

Walker was traded along with Chuck Essegian from the Orioles to the Athletics for Dick Hall and Dick Williams on April 12, 1961.

In 1963, Walker became a part of baseball history when he saved Early Wynn's 300th win on July 13, 1963. Wynn and the Indians were leading 5–1 heading to the bottom of the fifth, but when Wynn let up three runs in the bottom of the inning, he was pinch-hit for in the top of the sixth. Walker was tasked with preserving the one-run lead to keep Wynn eligible for the victory, and he threw four scoreless innings to secure the 7–4 victory.

By age 26, however, Walker was out of the Majors.  In 190 games pitched, 90 as a starter, he allowed 734 hits and 341 bases on balls over 747 innings. He had 326 strikeouts, 16 complete games, four shutouts and 13 saves.

Walker was an adept hitter, posting a .230 batting average (58-for-252) with 24 runs, 4 home runs and 21 RBI. He fielded his position well, recording a .989 fielding percentage with only two errors in 178 total chances.

Coach and front-office executive
Walker's active career ended in 1967 in the Double-A Eastern League, but he maintained his involvement in organized baseball as a minor league manager, big-league pitching coach, scout and front-office executive. He served one season as the general manager of the Detroit Tigers; the Tigers posted an 85–77 record and finished tied for third in the American League East Division that season.

From 1995 through 2007, Walker was the vice president and director of player personnel in the front office of the St. Louis Cardinals, working as a key assistant to then-GM Walt Jocketty. He then became a vice president and special assistant to Jocketty with the Cincinnati Reds, 2009–14.

See also
List of baseball players who went directly to Major League Baseball

References

External links

Coach's page, Retrosheet
Jerry Walker, Baseball America Executive Database

1939 births
Living people
American League All-Stars
Baltimore Orioles players
Baseball executives
Baseball players from Oklahoma
Binghamton Triplets players
Cincinnati Reds executives
Cleveland Indians players
Detroit Tigers executives
Detroit Tigers scouts
Houston Astros coaches
Jacksonville Suns players
Kansas City Athletics players
Knoxville Smokies players
Major League Baseball general managers
Major League Baseball pitchers
Major League Baseball pitching coaches
New York Yankees coaches
New York Yankees scouts
People from Ada, Oklahoma
Portland Beavers players
St. Louis Cardinals executives
Toledo Mud Hens players